Veil or similar may mean:
 Veil, an article of clothing
 Veil, a curtain or cloth hanging used in architecture, especially in a temple to separate a public space from a space reserved for the priesthood, or within a mosque to separate worshipers by gender.

Veil or similar may also mean:

In biology
 Veil (mycology), in mycology is a part of some fungi
 Veil, a name given to the caul, a membrane sometimes found on the face of a newborn child 
 A yeast film similar to flor, developing at the surface of wine in a barrel

Family name 
 Hans-Jürgen Veil (born 1946), a German wrestler
  (born 1966), a German legal scholar
 Simone Veil (1927–2017), a French lawyer and politician
  (1879-1965), a German architect

Popular culture

In fiction
 Veil (comics), a mutant in the Marvel Comics universe. 
 Veil, a character in the Battle Arena Toshinden fighting game series
 The Veil, a creature in Doctor Who
 The Lifted Veil, lost 1917 silent starring Ethel Barrymore
 The Veil (American TV series), a 1958 American horror/suspense anthology television series
 The Veil (2016 film), a 2016 film directed by Phil Joanou and starring Jessica Alba
 The Veil (2017 film), a 2017 film directed by Brent Ryan Green
 Veil, a subordinate gateway realm that connects reality with the Black Sun dimension in the 2009 video game Wolfenstein
 The Veil (South Korean TV series), a 2021 television series

In nonfiction
 Veil: The Secret Wars of the CIA, a 1987 book by political reporter Bob Woodward

In music
 Veil (album), a 1993 album by Band of Susans
 The Veils, a UK-based rock band
 Veil, a Korean music group
 The Veil (album)

In other uses
 Veil (cosmetics), used to fixate the makeup and give a finish
 VEIL, an acronym for Video Encoded Invisible Light, a technology for encoding low-bandwidth digital data bitstream in video signal for communication, also used as a Digital Rights Management tool

See also 

 Vail (disambiguation)
 Vejle, a town in Denmark

German-language surnames
French-language surnames
Levite surnames